Hardy Farm tram stop was a proposed future tram stop on the phase 3b plans to Manchester Airport, which would have been on the north side of Sale Water Park. It was due to open in 2016 but was dropped from the plans.

References
 
 

Proposed Manchester Metrolink tram stops